Tom Elliott Klose (22 January 1918 – 13 June 1986) was an Australian cricketer who played first-class cricket for South Australia between 1939 and 1950.

A middle-order batsman, left-arm orthodox spin or medium-pace bowler and brilliant fieldsman, Tom Klose was considered one of Australia's most promising young cricketers immediately before World War II. In his debut first-class season of 1939–40 he made 305 runs at an average of 23.46, took 18 wickets at 16.88, and took 10 catches.

Klose served in the Army from 1940 to 1945. He played a few seasons after the war without fulfilling his youthful promise. He retained his fielding skill, however: playing for Prospect in the 1948–49 Adelaide season, he won the competition fielding prize with 62 points, well ahead of the second-placed player, Neil Dansie, on 39.

References

External links

Tom Klose at CricketArchive

1918 births
1986 deaths
Australian cricketers
South Australia cricketers
Cricketers from Adelaide